Sir John Holkell (died 28 June 1771) was an English governmental functionary. He was the Acting Governor of Bombay for a short time at the start of 1760; he was relieved of his command by the arrival of Charles Crommelin on 28 February 1760.

Holkell married Mary Bray (1743-1801) in October 1758; they had no children. He died at Bombay on 28 June 1771. He was buried at St. Thomas's in the Fort.

References

Governors of Bombay
Year of birth unknown
1771 deaths